Ojibwa is an unincorporated community located in the town of Ojibwa, Sawyer County, Wisconsin, United States. Ojibwa had a post office that closed on June 13, 1986.

References

Unincorporated communities in Sawyer County, Wisconsin
Unincorporated communities in Wisconsin